Kayne Vincent (born 29 October 1988) is a New Zealand professional footballer who currently plays as a forward for Western Springs in the Northern League.

Born in Auckland, he played football in Japan, New Zealand, India, Australia, Thailand and Malaysia. He is one of the foreign players who received the most attention in 2016 Malaysia Premier League. He was born to a Japanese mother and a Kiwi father.

Club career

Cerezo Osaka & Gainare Tottori
Vincent began his professional career for Cerezo Osaka of the J2 League. After playing for Cerezo Osaka in 2007, Vincent transferred to Gainare Tottori for the 2007/08 season. There, Vincent appeared in eight matches, scoring in two of them before getting injured for three months. After his second season in Japan, Vincent transferred to Waitakere United of the ASB Premiership.

Waitakere United
In December 2008, Vincent played in Waitakere United's 1–2 loss against Adelaide United in the 2008 FIFA Club World Cup in Tokyo, Japan. Vincent also scored in a 2–1 loss against the Kuwait national team.

Waitakere City F.C. & Mumbai FC
For Waitakere City F.C. in the Lotto Sport Italia NRFL Premier, Vincent scored 20 goals in 15 games, before signing a 1-year deal for Mumbai FC for the 2009–10 I-League season. He Scored only 2 goals for the team but had an impressive 11 assists to his name from 12 games. After finishing his 1-year contract with the club he later on rejected a contract extension from Mumbai FC for the 2010–11 I-League season.

Churchill Brothers SC
After Mumbai FC he signed a contract with Churchill Brothers SC for the 2010–11 I-League season. He scored 12 goals and 4 assists in 15 matches.

Melbourne Knights
On 1 June 2011 Vincent signed with VPL club Melbourne Knights on a short-term deal during the i-League off season. At his time with the Knights he scored an impressive 7 goals in 8 matches.

Prayag United
After his stint with the Melbourne Knights Vincent signed for I-League club Prayag United S.C. for the 2011–12 season. He played in Prayag's first tournament of the season during the 2011 Indian Federation Cup where he scored one goal in three appearances. In October 2011 Prayag United came runners up in the Durand Cup losing to Churchill Brothers SC in the final on Penalties. In the I-League season, Vincent managed to score 11 goals in 18 games for Prayag United. Including the 92nd min winner against city rivals East Bengal where he ran the length of the pitch in injury time. It is believed that Vincent played this and a number of games before with a stress fracture in his heel but played as the team already had a number of injured players. He returned to the field 6 weeks later and scored the winning goal against Botafogo FC of Brazil in the 116th minute in the IFA Shield semi-final, Prayag won 1–0. At the end of season he re-signed for Prayag United for the upcoming 2012–2013 season.

FC Gifu
On 17 July 2013, Vincent signed for J2 League club FC Gifu, closing the Chapter on his career in India.

Songkhla United
Vincent signed a 1-year contract for Thai Premier League club Songkhla United for the 2014 season, he managed 12 League goals in 31 appearances and 1 Cup goal in 1 Cup appearance.
impressing many clubs around the country, Vincent went on to sign a contract with Thai Champions and Asian Champions League Club Buriram United for the 2015 season.

Buriram United and Port F.C. 

Vincent wore the no.9 Jersey at Thai League Champion side Buriram United who competed in the 2015 Asian Champioms League. However, he just played a few games and loaned to Port F.C.

Perlis FA

Kayne Vincent played in Malaysia  2nd division club, Perlis FA. He showed impressive gameplay in 2016 pre-season matches. Vincent scored 7 goals in 10 matches and was the club's top scorer. After the club couldn't pay his wages due to financial difficulty, Vincent returned to Thailand, where he signed for T2 side, Air Force Central FC, who were looking for promotion for the past 3 seasons.

Air Force Central FC

Vincent signed a 2-year contract with Air Force FC, despite a few offers from T1, Vincent was focused on promotion and stated that was his challenge. An injury 3 games into the season saw Vincent sidelined for 9 matches which saw the team drop from 1st to 8th. After Vincent's return to the team, he helped the club set a record of 11 straight victories putting them back up to 1st place, scoring 11 goals after his return. Air Force Central FC have now gained promotion to T1 next season with 3 games remaining.

Auckland City FC

Vincent returned home to New Zealand and joined up with Auckland City FC in the ISPS Handa Men's Premiership in January 2021 making his debut for the club as a substitute in their 4–0 win over Hawke's Bay United in Napier on 31 January 2021, providing an assist for Yousif Al-Kalisy's goal.

Western Springs AFC
On 5 April 2021, Vincent played for Western Springs AFC in the Northern League and scored 2 goals in his debut.

International career
Vincent has also played for the New Zealand under-20 national team. On 6 November 2014, he earned his debut call up to the national team to face China and Thailand in friendlies.

Honours
Prayag United
IFA Shield: 2013

References

External links
 

1988 births
Living people
Association footballers from Auckland
New Zealand people of Japanese descent
Mumbai FC players
Churchill Brothers FC Goa players
Expatriate footballers in India
New Zealand expatriate sportspeople in India
Waitakere United players
Melbourne Knights FC players
Waitakere City FC players
I-League players
United SC players
J2 League players
Japan Football League players
Cerezo Osaka players
Gainare Tottori players
FC Gifu players
Expatriate footballers in Thailand
Kayne Vincent
Kayne Vincent
Kayne Vincent
Association football forwards
New Zealand association footballers
New Zealand international footballers
Calcutta Football League players
New Zealand National League players